Francesco Servino (Castellammare di Stabia, born May 8, 1984) is an Italian journalist and activist well known for his defense of Vesuvius National Park and archaeological sites in Vesuvian area.

Activist since 2009, when he animated the protests of the citizens of Boscoreale and Terzigno against the opening of a mega landfill in the Vesuvius National Park (Cava Vitiello), he leads numerous environmental and cultural projects in the Vesuvius area, networking with local associations and national. Since 2018 he has chaired the Arcadia Social Promotion Association and in 2022 he founded the environmentalist civic movement "Terzigno Verde", which has the European Greens as a reference. He is the promoter of the Network of Green Associations and vice-president of the Spartacus Cultural Association of Ottaviano, with which he deals with the enhancement of the so-called minor archaeological sites of the Nolan and Vesuvian area. Thanks also to his commitment, an archaeological site in Terzigno (Cava Ranieri), already used as a landfill and subject to the wild abandonment of waste since the 1980s, has been reclaimed. He actively follows the problem of the "Terra dei Fuochi" and undertakes to report phenomena such as the illegal dumping of waste in the Vesuvian area, the pollution of crops in the Nocerino-Sarnese area due to the abuse of pesticides and the pollution of the Sarno river.

See also
Mass media in Italy

References

1984 births
Living people
People from Castellammare di Stabia
Italian journalists
Italian male journalists
Italian environmentalists
Italian activists